Tom Nisbet (born 8 October 1999) is an English professional rugby league footballer who plays as a  or er for Leigh Leopards in the Super League. 

He was previously with St Helens (Heritage № 1254) in the Super League. He has previously played on loan at Oldham (Heritage № 1437) in the RFL Championship.

Background
Nisbet signed from amateur team Newton Storm ARLFC and played three seasons at U19 level. He has also represented Lancashire and England Academies.

Career

St Helens
Nisbet made his first team début for St Helens on the  against the Salford Red Devils on 26 Oct 2020. Due to end-of-season fixture congestion caused by the COVID-19 pandemic, Saints fielded a very young side, resting the majority of first team players, in preparation of their derby match against the Wigan Warriors just four days later.

Oldham R.L.F.C. (loan)
On 21 May 2021 it was reported that he had signed for Oldham R.L.F.C. in the RFL Championship on loan

Leigh Centurions (loan)
On 28 August 2021, it was reported that he had signed for Leigh in the Super League on an initial one-week loan, which was subsequently revised to cover the whole 2022 season

References

External links
St Helens profile

1999 births
Living people
English rugby league players
Leigh Leopards players
Oldham R.L.F.C. players
Rugby league fullbacks
Rugby league wingers
St Helens R.F.C. players